James or Jimmy Murphy may refer to:

Literature, film, and art
James Murphy (Irish novelist) (1839–1921)
 James Cavanah Murphy (1760–1814), Irish architect and antiquary
 James Vincent Murphy (1880–1946), translated Hitler's Mein Kampf into English
 Jimmy Murphy (cartoonist) (1891–1965), cartoonist of the Toots and Casper comic strip
 Jimmy Murphy (playwright) (born 1962), Irish playwright

Music 
 Jimmy Murphy (country musician) (1925–1981), American country musician
 James Murphy (electronic musician) (born 1970), American, leader of LCD Soundsystem
 James Murphy (guitarist) (born 1967), American heavy metal guitarist

Politics and law
James Murphy (Canadian politician) (1872–1921), lawyer and politician in British Columbia, Canada
James Murphy (Irish politician) (1887–1961), Irish Sinn Féin & Cumann na nGaedhael politician from Louth
James Murphy (New South Wales politician), member of the New South Wales Legislative Council and Mayor of Sydney
James A. Murphy III (born c. 1961), Former District Attorney, current County Court Judge, Saratoga County, New York
James A. Murphy (1889–1939), member of the Michigan Senate, 1933–1939
James E. Murphy (1897–1986), American judge
James J. Murphy (1898–1962), United States Representative from New York
James Laurence Murphy (1860–1942), Australian politician and member of the Victorian Legislative Assembly
James M. Murphy, Massachusetts State Representative
James W. Murphy (politician) (1852–1913), Wisconsin state legislator
James William Murphy (1858–1927), United States Representative from Wisconsin
James Murphy (Victorian politician) (1821–1888), brewer and politician in colonial Victoria

Sports 
 Jimmy Murphy (racing driver) (1894–1924), American racing driver
 James Murphy (athlete) (1880–1962), British Olympic athlete
 James Murphy (cricketer) (1911–1984), Australian cricketer
 James Murphy (gridiron football) (born 1959), retired American and Canadian football player
 Jimmy Murphy (footballer) (1910–1989), Welsh football player and manager
 James Murphy (soccer, born 1936), retired American soccer player
 James Murphy (soccer, born 1997), football midfielder for Los Angeles FC
 James Murphy (rugby union) (born 1995), South African rugby sevens player
 Jimmy Barry-Murphy (born 1954), former Irish hurler, Gaelic footballer and association footballer

Other 
 James Bumgardner Murphy (1884–1950), American pathologist and cancer researcher
 James Murphy (bishop) (1744–1824), Bishop of Clogher
 James Murphy (architect) (1834–1907), Irish-American architect
 James Ford Murphy, head of animation at Pixar Animation Studios
 James D. "Murph" Murphy (born 1964), founder and CEO, Afterburner Inc.

See also 
 James Francis Murphy (disambiguation)
 Jamie Murphy (disambiguation)
 Jim Murphy (disambiguation)
 Séamus Murphy (disambiguation), Irish equivalent
 Murphy's Brewery, founder James Jeremiah Murphy (1825–1897)